The State Bank Tower is a high-rise building in the capital city of Mauritius, Port Louis. The 16-storey tower contrary to popular belief, is not the tallest building in Port Louis. It is the fourth tallest building and only steel frame skeleton high-rise on the island.

It was designed by Campbell Reith Hill. In February 1994, it was damaged by cyclone Hollanda which hit Mauritius with windspeeds of over 200 km/h when the building's construction tower crane smashed and tore on the high-rise. The 82 m tall tower, hosting mostly offices, was finally inaugurated in 1995.

External links
Le Mauricien
Campbell Reith

Skyscraper office buildings in Mauritius
Office buildings completed in 1995